Mezhdurechenskoe or Mezhdurechenskoye (Mejdurechenskoe) is a village in Ile District of Almaty Region in south-eastern Kazakhstan.

References

Populated places in Almaty Region